Width across flats is the distance between two parallel surfaces on the head of a screw or bolt, or a nut, mostly for torque transmission by positive locking.

The term width across flats (AF) is used for the following forms:

 2-socket = round material with two surfaces
 4-socket = profile square section
 6-socket, 8-square = regular polygons

Spanner 
The width across flats indicates the nominal "size" of the spanner. It is imprinted on the spanners in millimeter (mm) values. Older British and current US spanners (wrenches) have inch sizes that are imprinted in intermediate sizes in fractions.

The two systems are in general not compatible, which can result in rounding of nuts and bolts (i.e. using a 13 mm spanner in place of a ). There are some exceptions with a few sizes being close enough to interchange. This includes 19 mm and  in (19.05 mm), which are interchangeable for most purposes. Sizes that may interchange, depending on the precision needed, include 2 mm (close to  in (1.98 mm)), 4 mm (close to  in (3.97 mm)) and 8 mm (close to  in (7.94 mm)).

In reality, a wrench with a width across the flats of exactly 15mm would fit too tightly to use on a bolt with a width across the flats of 15mm. The tolerances necessary to make the tools usable are listed in documents like  ASME/ANSI B18.2.2 for U.S. standards. For instance, a bolt for a 1 inch nominal diameter thread might have flats that are 1.5 inches apart. The wrench for this bolt should have flats that are between 1.508 and 1.520 inches apart to allow for a little extra space between the nut flats and the bolt flats. This means that the wrench slips easily over the bolt, and can be removed easily as well.

Width across flats 

The width across flats of the fastener (for example screws, nuts, clamps) is nominally the same as that on the tool. The table below shows dimensions of standard metric spanners:

Widths for bicycles 
In addition to industry standards, there are special thread standards, such as the bicycle threads according to DIN 79012, a fastening thread on metric-inch size basis of the designation.
Modern bicycle spokes carry the bike thread FG 2.3. A spoke wrench matching the spoke nipple is needed.

References

Screws
Wrenches

External links 
 Nut and wrench tolerance chart